Rama Raghav is an Indian Marathi language television series which is produced under the banner of Creative Transmedia. The show premiered from 9 January 2023 on Colors Marathi. It stars Aishwarya Shete and Nikhil Damle in lead roles. It is an official remake of Kannada show Ramachaari.

Cast 
 Aishwarya Shete as Rama Paranjape
 Nikhil Damle as Raghav Purohit
 Gautam Joglekar as Girish Paranjape
 Shital Kshirsagar as Lavanya Paranjape 
 Sai Ranade as Pavitra Paranjape 
 Smita Haldankar as Arushi
 Suhita Thatte
 Prajakta Kelkar
 Sonal Pawar as Ashwini
 Shubham Rane as Narayan
 Archana Nipankar as Pooja
 Chandanraj Jamdade as Kartikeya
 Priyanka Deshmukh as Neha

Adaptations

References

External links 
 Rama Raghav at Voot

2023 Indian television series debuts
Colors Marathi original programming
Marathi-language television shows